Billboard Greatest Christmas Hits is a set of two Christmas-themed compilation albums released by Rhino Records in 1989, each featuring ten popular Christmas recordings from 1935 to 1983, many of which charted on the Billboard record charts. Both volumes were certified Gold by the RIAA in the U.S., with the second volume being certified Platinum.

1935–1954

"White Christmas" — Bing Crosby
"Let It Snow! Let It Snow! Let It Snow!" — Vaughn Monroe
"Rudolph, the Red-Nosed Reindeer" — Gene Autry
"The Christmas Song" — Nat "King" Cole
"All I Want for Christmas (Is My Two Front Teeth)" — Spike Jones & His City Slickers
"I Saw Mommy Kissing Santa Claus" — Jimmy Boyd
"Christmas Island" — Andrews Sisters & Guy Lombardo
"Silent Night" — Bing Crosby
"Here Comes Santa Claus (Down Santa Claus Lane)" — Gene Autry
"Santa Baby" — Eartha Kitt

Reception
Shawn Haney of Allmusic says the album is a "charming collection of golden classic Christmas favorites" that "should appeal to all ages." Featuring "everybody and everything from the Bing himself to Gene Autry's "Rudolph the Red-Nosed Reindeer" to "All I Want for Christmas," a comedic, hilarious family favorite".
The album peaked at #24 on Billboard's Top Christmas Albums in 1991 and charted a total of 7 weeks.

1955–Present

"Jingle Bell Rock" — Bobby Helms
"Rockin' Around the Christmas Tree" — Brenda Lee
"The Chipmunk Song" — The Chipmunks with David Seville
"The Little Drummer Boy" — The Harry Simeone Chorale
"Mary's Boy Child" — Harry Belafonte
"Blue Christmas" — Elvis Presley
"Nuttin' for Christmas" — Barry Gordon
"Please Come Home for Christmas" — Charles Brown
"White Christmas" — The Drifters
"Grandma Got Run Over by a Reindeer" — Elmo 'n Patsy

Reception
Allmusic critic Stewart Mason calls the album "a rather skimpy but nonetheless useful compilation of Christmas songs" and says it "wisely steers mostly clear of the annoying novelty Christmas songs of the rock era." While it does include the "horrifyingly bad 'Grandma Got Run Over By a Reindeer'," it also includes "Charles Brown's 'Please Come Home for Christmas', maybe the best R&B Christmas song ever".  The album peaked at #15 on Billboard's Top Christmas Albums in 1991 and charted a total of 59 weeks.

Other albums
Rhino Records subsequently released five other albums as Billboard Christmas hits:
Billboard Greatest Country Christmas Hits (1990)
Track Listing
"Blue Christmas" — Ernest Tubb
"Christmas Carols by the Old Corral" — Tex Ritter
"Will Santy Come to Shanty Town" — Eddy Arnold
"Little Sandy Sleighfoot" — Jimmy Dean
"Jingle Bell Rock" — Bobby Helms
"White Christmas" — Ernest Tubb
"The Little Drummer Boy" — Johnny Cash
"C-H-R-I-S-T-M-A-S" — Eddy Arnold
"I Saw Mommy Kissing Santa Claus" — Jimmy Boyd
"Santa Looked a Lot Like Daddy" — Buck Owens & His Buckaroos

''Billboard Greatest R&B Christmas Hits (1990)
Track Listing
"Merry Christmas, Baby" — Johnny Moore's Three Blazers
"(It's Gonna Be A) Lonely Christmas" — The Orioles
"Boogie Woogie Santa Claus" — Mabel Scott
"Let's Make Christmas Merry, Baby" — Amos Milburn
"The Little Drummer Boy" — Lou Rawls
"This Time of the Year" — Brook Benton
"Rudolph the Red-Nosed Reindeer" — The Cadillacs
"Run Rudolph Run" — Chuck Berry
"Santa Claus Is Coming to Town" — The Jackson 5
"Silent Night" — Sister Rosetta TharpeBillboard Rock 'n' Roll Christmas (1994)
Track Listing
"Thank God It's Christmas" — Queen
"Christmas Is the Time to Say 'I Love You'" — Billy Squier
"Rock and Roll Christmas" — George Thorogood & the Destroyers
"Christmas at Ground Zero" — Weird Al Yankovic
"All I Want for Christmas Is You" — Foghat
"Father Christmas" — The Kinks
"Run Rudolph Run" — Chuck Berry
"Little Saint Nick" — The Beach Boys
"Christmas Blues" — Canned Heat
"Santa Claus and His Old Lady" — Cheech & ChongBillboard Presents: Family Christmas Classics (1995)
Track Listing
"Christmas Time Is Here" — Vince Guaraldi Trio
"Welcome Christmas" — Boris Karloff / MGM Studio Orchestra
"We Need a Little Christmas" — Angela Lansbury
"The Chipmunk Song (Christmas Don't Be Late)" — Alvin & the Chipmunks / David Seville
"Riu Chiu" — The Monkees
"A Holly Jolly Christmas" — Burl Ives
"Comin' Up Christmas Time" — Yogi Bear & Friends
"White Christmas" — Bing Crosby
"Frosty the Snowman" — Jimmy Durante
"Have Yourself a Merry Little Christmas" — Judy GarlandBillboard'' Top Christmas Hymns (1995)
Track Listing
"Joy To The World" — Philadelphia Orchestra
"Hark! The Herald Angels Sing" — Mormon Tabernacle Choir
"O Holy Night" — Andy Williams
"The First Noel" — Johnny Mathis / Percy Faith & His Orchestra
"It Came Upon A Midnight Clear/Good King Wenceslas/We Three Kings/Villancico/Hark! The Herald Angels" — Harry Simeone Chorale
"O Come, All Ye Faithful" — Leonard Bernstein / Mormon Tabernacle Choir / New York Philharmonic
"Away In A Manger" — Julie Andrews / André Previn
"Medley: The Joys of Christmas/O Little Town Of Bethlehem/Deck The Halls/The First Noel" — Harry Belafonte
"God Rest Ye Merry, Gentlemen" — Ray Conniff & the Singers
"Medley: Hark! The Herald Angels Sing/O Little Town Of Bethlehem/Silent Night" — John Gary

See Also
Billboard Christmas Holiday Charts

References

1989 Christmas albums
1989 compilation albums
Christmas albums by American artists
Christmas
Christmas compilation albums
Compilation album series
Pop Christmas albums
Various artists albums